Paradiplocampta is a genus of bee flies in the family Bombyliidae. There is at least one described species in Paradiplocampta, P. tabeti.

References

Further reading

 

Bombyliidae
Articles created by Qbugbot
Bombyliidae genera